Matthew Brailsford was the Dean of Wells between 1713 and 1733.

References

Deans of Wells